Frobisher Bay may refer to:

 Iqaluit, the territorial capital of Nunavut
 Frobisher Bay, the inlet on which Iqaluit sits